In mycology, a volva is a cup-like structure at the base of a mushroom that is a remnant of the universal veil, or the remains of the peridium that encloses the immature fruit bodies of gasteroid fungi. This macrofeature is important in wild mushroom identification because it is an easily observed, taxonomically significant feature that frequently signifies a member of Amanitaceae. This has particular importance due to the disproportionately high number of deadly poisonous species contained within that family.

A mushroom's volva is often partially or completely buried in the ground, and therefore care must be taken to check for its presence when identifying mushrooms. Cutting or pulling mushrooms and attempting to identify them later without having noted this feature could be a fatal error.

Whilst a volva is a feature best known from Amanita species and stinkhorns (Phallaceae) it may also occur with other genera including:

 Volvariella
 Volvopluteus
 Volvanarius

References

See also
 Partial veil

Fungal morphology and anatomy